Greatest Hits Radio South Yorkshire was a local radio station serving South Yorkshire and the North Midlands. The station was folded into Greatest Hits Radio Yorkshire, as part of a rebrand, on 1 September 2020.

Technical 

The station broadcast on three separate frequencies, 990 kHz in Doncaster, 1305 kHz in Barnsley and 1548 kHz in Sheffield.

History 
The station was created when Radio Hallam split its FM and medium wave frequencies to provide two different services. The AM station became "Classic Gold", then "Classic Gold Radio", "Great Yorkshire Gold" and "Great Yorkshire Radio". The original incarnation was owned by The Yorkshire Radio Network who were then taken over by Metro Radio group before being bought by EMAP in 1996.

At the start of 1997, Emap decided to scrap the regional Classic Gold station and replaced it with local stations under the brandname of Magic, with a new format of Hot Adult Contemporary music. Magic AM launched at 8 am on 12 February 1997.

In December 2001, EMAP decided that it was more economical for the Magic AM to share off-peak programmes in line with the other 7 Magic stations in northern England. Stations began networking 10 am-2 pm from Magic 1152 in Manchester, and 7 pm-6 am from the London station Magic 105.4 providing the programmes – during these hours it was simply known as Magic, although there were local commercial breaks, and local news on the hour.

In January 2003 after a sharp decline in listening, the station ceased networking with the London station, Magic 105.4, and a regional northern network was created with Magic 1152 at the hub at the weekend and the Newcastle station of the same name during the week. During networked hours, local adverts are aired, as well as a local news summary on the hour.

From July 2006, more networking was introduced across the northern Magic stations, meaning only the breakfast show would be produced locally. However the decision was taken in April 2013 to network this show across the other Yorkshire-based Magic stations and the Leeds-based programme replaced the locally produced show. The regional breakfast show was axed in December 2014.

On 5 January 2015, Magic AM was rebranded as Hallam 2 as part of a revamp of the Bauer network and is entirely networked with the other Bauer AM stations in the North although local news, weather and travel continue to be broadcast as opt-outs during the day.

On 7 January 2019, Hallam 2 rebranded as Greatest Hits South Yorkshire.

References

External links 
 Transmitter Information

Bauer Radio
Radio stations in Yorkshire
Mass media in Sheffield
Radio stations established in 1989